The Oxford Book of Tudor Anthems is a collection of vocal scores of music from the Tudor era of England (c.1550-1625). It was published in 1978 by Oxford University Press and was compiled by the organist and publisher Christopher Morris (1922-2014), the editor of OUP who also was involved with the popular Carols for Choirs series of books in the 1970s. The preface is written by Sir David Willcocks.

A recording was issued in 1979, Tudor Anthems (OUP 153), featuring 13 anthems from the Oxford Book of Tudor Anthems sung by the Choir of Christ Church Cathedral, Oxford and conducted by Simon Preston.

Contents
The collection encompasses 34 motets and anthems by 14 different composers who were active during the Tudor Period, sometimes referred as "the Golden Age of English church music", which spans from around 1500 to the end of the reign of King James VI and I in 1625. This period in English history was especially marked by the religious upheaval of the English Reformation, which was advanced by King Edward VI. With competing demands over the language of Church of England liturgy, composers of this era variously set both Latin and English texts to music, and this is reflected in the range of works presented in this book. The later anthems in English take their texts from the King James Bible of 1604, but words from earlier Bible translations such as the 1526 Tyndale Bible and from prayer books such as the 1549 Book of Common Prayer are also included. A variety of musical styles is represented in the collection, from simple four-part harmony to more elaborate polyphonic motets for up to eight voices, including both a cappella pieces and anthems requiring instrumental accompaniment.

Sources for this collection include a set of partbooks from the British Library, copied by Thomas Myriell and entitled Trisitiae Remedium (1616), and partbooks sourced from the libraries of Christ Church, Oxford (c.1620) and St Michael's College, Tenbury (c.1615).

See also
Tudor music
List of Anglican church composers
List of Renaissance composers
Drexel 4180–4185
Oxford Book of English Madrigals

References

External links

Source of cover art by William Camden (1551–1623): 

Music books
1978 books
Tudor Anthems
Anglican church music
Renaissance music
Books on English music
Anglican liturgical books